The 30th Legislative Assembly of Ontario was in session from September 18, 1975, until April 29, 1977, just prior to the 1977 general election. The Ontario Progressive Conservative Party led by Bill Davis formed a minority government.

Russell Daniel Rowe served as speaker for the assembly.

Members

Notes

References 
Members in Parliament 30

Terms of the Legislative Assembly of Ontario
1975 establishments in Ontario
1977 disestablishments in Ontario